CTMA can refer to several different things:

 China Tibet Mountaineering Association
 Confederation of Tamil Nadu Malayalee Associations
 Coopérative de transport maritime et aérien, a company operating ferry services in Canada
 Cetyltrimethyl ammonium
 Compendium of Therapeutics for Minor Ailments